Abandoned Apartments is the fifth album by Jeremy Jay, released by K Records. It was recorded over a long period of self-produced sessions. The album was released on vinyl and on CD.

"Graveyard Shift", the first track taken from the album, was described by Pitchfork as "comfortable [with] warm, long hypnotic stretches.

Two singles, each including an extra track, were taken from the album. "Covered in Ivy" b/w  "Situations Said" was released on digital download in August 2013, followed a few months later by "Sentimental Expressway" b/w "Later that Night", also released on digital download.

Track listing 
All tracks by Jeremy Jay

Sentimental Expressway		
Covered In Ivy		
Graveyard Shift		
The View From The Train Window		
Red Primary Afternoon		
Far & Near		
When I Met You		
Abandoned Apartments		
You Said It Was Forever		
I Was Waiting

Personnel 
Jeremy Jay - guitar, piano, vocals, producer
Jet Marshall - guitar
Tony Harewood - bass
Jacob Grace - drums

References

2013 albums
Jeremy Jay albums
K Records albums